Wat Yansangwararam Woramahawihan or Wat Yan is located in Huai Yai in the Chonburi province of Thailand. It is a large Buddhist temple complex with gardens and lakes and has been under the patronage of Bhumibol Adulyadej. Most of the buildings at Wat Yansangwararam were erected in honor of the Thai Royal Family. The temple is a replica of the Mahabodhi Temple in Bodh Gaya, Bihar, India.

International pavilions with ornaments around the adjacent lake and statues of revered monks, also of Bhumibol Adulyadej and his mother Srinagarindra, the Royal Grandmother, in the middle of parks offer the opportunity to walk for hours and study.

History 
The monastery Wat Yansangwararam, which only was built in 1976 by Vajirañāṇasaṃvara or Somdet Phra Nyanasamvara, the 19th Supreme Patriarch of the Thai Sangha for Dharma practice, especially for Samatha and Vipassana, is an important center of the Dhammayuttika Nikaya in Thailand. The project started up on initial  donated by Dr. Kajorn and Khun Ying Nithiwadee Ontrakarn. Additional land in the area has been purchased by members of the building committee and devout supporters of Somdet Phra Nyanasamvara. The complex is divided into four zones: 1) - Buddhavas, the heart of the monastery. 2) Sanghavas, the living quarters for monks. 3) Karavas, the living quarters for Laity who come to practice Vipassanā and to observe Buddhist prescriptions. 4) Agricultural Education, Career Development Center, and Wildlife Care and Breeding Center.

Wat Yansangwararam honors the memory Naresuan and Taksin but also Sirikit, Srinagarindra, Bhumibol Adulyadej, Mahidol Adulyadej, Sirindhorn and holy Buddhist monks.

Buildings and monuments within the monastery 
 Ariyakarn, designed by Khun Sanit and Khun Preeya Chimchom featuring twenty-two holy monks and two laity.
 Phra Borommathat Chedi Maha Chakkri Phiphat, built to honor past monarchs of the Chakri Dynasty.
 Tipitika Ho Phra Trai Pidok or scripture hall, built in the traditional Thai practice of keeping the Buddhist Holy Scriptures.
 Ubosoth Hall, built as a merit-making tribute to King Taksin the Great.
 The Replica Buddhagaya Chedi, built to fulfill Somdet Phra Nyanasamvara’s desire to have a commemorative structure constructed for the Lord Buddha in this monastery.
 Phra Maha Mondop Phuttabat PhorPorRor. SorKor., built as a homage to King Bhumibol Adulyadej and Queen Sirikit. 
 Lord Virulhaka Maharaja Buddha Pandit Shrine 
 Chiwaka Komaraphat Hermitage, inside the building are two Chiwaka Komaraphat Hermitages.
 Bell Tower
 Phra Pokklao Ariyakhet monument, built as a merit-making homage to King Prachadhipok, also Rama VII.
 MorWorKor SorThor Pavilion, built in tribute to Crown Prince Maha Vajiralongkorn and Princess Maha Chakri Sirindhorn.
 SorWor KorWor Pavilion, built in tribute to Her Royal Highness Princess Srinagarindra.
 Somdet Phra Srinagarindra Boromrajajonani Pavilion, built as a homage to Her Royal Highness Princess Srinagarindra, the Princess Mother, upon her 90th birth anniversary in 1990.
 Phra Sri Ariya Metteyya Vihara, featuring a Jaturamuk style hall with a Ariya Metteyya Buddha image.
 The Prince Father and Princess Mother Memorial Garden, two monuments of Mahidol Adulyadej and Princess Srinagarindra.
 Drum Tower

On the banks of the Klong Ban Amphoe water reservoir to the entrance of Wat Yansangwararam in 2021, there are eight pavilions that were built in honor of Bhumibol Adulyadej on the  auspicious occasion of his 5th Cycle Birthday Anniversary, 'Lan Na', Pavilion Thailand, 'Isan', Pavilion Thailand, 'Jeen Nok' and 'Jeen Nai', Pavilion(s) Singapore, 'Japanese' Pavilion Japan, 'India' Pavilion India; and the 'Western', Pavilion French Switzerland.

Physical geography 

Nearby places 
Nong Nooch Tropical Garden
Viharnra Sien

See also 
Mahabodhi Temple
List of Buddhist temples in Thailand

References

External links
Wat Yansangwararam *Official website Wat Yansangwararam

Buddhist monasteries in Thailand
Buddhist temples in Chonburi Province